Sir Thomas Hutchison (1866 – 1925) was a Scottish landowner and politician. He served as Lord Provost of Edinburgh from 1921 to 1923.

Life
He was born at Carlowrie House on 16 December 1866, the son of Robert Hutchison of Carlowrie and his wife, Mary Jemima Tait. His younger brother was the eminent physician Sir Robert Hutchison, independently knighted for his medical contributions.

He succeeded John William Chesser as Lord Provost in 1921 and was succeeded in turn by William Lowrie Sleigh in 1923.

His Edinburgh address was 28 Royal Terrace on Calton Hill but he also inherited the family home of Carlowrie Castle near Kirkliston.

He died on 12 April 1925. He is buried with his wife in Dean Cemetery in western Edinburgh. The grave lies on the south path close to the main (east) entrance.

Family
He was married to Jane Moir Ogilvy Spence (1873–1935).

Recognition
The Hutchison area of Edinburgh was named after Hutchison during his term as Lord Provost.

See also
Hutchison baronets

References

1866 births
1925 deaths
Politicians from Edinburgh
19th-century Scottish medical doctors
20th-century Scottish medical doctors
Fellows of the Royal Society of Edinburgh
Asbestos
Lord Provosts of Edinburgh
Scottish knights
Burials at the Dean Cemetery